Ulrike I. Kramm is a German chemistry professor at Technische Universität Darmstadt. Her research considers the development and characterisation of metal catalysts for fuel cells, CO2 conversion and solar fuels.

Early life and education 
Kramm was a student at Westsächsische Hochschule Zwickau. Her undergraduate thesis involved nitrogen doped titania for photoelectrocatalytic water splitting, and she performed her experiments at the Hahn-Meitner-Institute. She joined Technical University of Berlin for doctoral research, where she started to research pyrolysed iron-porphyrin electrocatalysts. She was a postdoctoral researcher at Helmholtz-Zentrum Berlin, BTU Cottbus and INRS-EMT.

Research and career 
Kramm leads a research group at Technische Universität Darmstadt that focuses on catalysis. She works to design new catalytic materials that can improve the energy efficiency of preparation processes. She has focussed on M-N-C catalysts, specifically, Fe-N-C. Fe-N-C catalysts are almost as active as platinum catalysts, but the iron-based catalysts are not stable enough to use in the automotive industry.

Kramm also works on Mössbauer spectroscopy, providing detailed elemental information about materials, including the chemical environment of certain nuclei.

Awards and honours 
 2019 Merck & Co. Curious Mind Researcher Award
 2020 German Research Foundation Heinz Maier-Leibnitz Prize

Selected publications

References 

German women chemists
Living people
Year of birth missing (living people)
Academic staff of Technische Universität Darmstadt
Technical University of Berlin alumni
21st-century German chemists